Chumuckla is a census-designated place in Santa Rosa County, Florida, United States. The population of Chumuckla was 850 in the 2010 census. The population was estimated to be 863 in 2017.

References

External links
 Chumuckla website

Census-designated places in Santa Rosa County, Florida
Pensacola metropolitan area
Census-designated places in Florida